Frank Anthony Mekules (November 16, 1918 – September 5, 1958) was an American professional basketball player and minor league baseball player. He played in the National Basketball League for the Detroit Gems for three games in the 1946–47 season and averaged 2.0 points per game. In baseball, he played for the Amarillo Gold Sox, Jackson Senators, and Pensacola Fliers.

References 

1918 births
1958 deaths
Amarillo Gold Sox players
American men's basketball players
Basketball players from Detroit
Detroit Gems players
Forwards (basketball)
Jackson Senators players
Michigan State Spartans baseball players
Michigan State Spartans men's basketball players
Pensacola Fliers players
Western International High School alumni